Very Happy Alexander ("Blissful Alexander") is a 1968 French comedy film, directed by Yves Robert, starring Philippe Noiret, Marlène Jobert and Françoise Brion. This was comic actor Pierre Richard's third appearance on film,  playing a secondary role toward the end of the plot.

The film was released on DVD on 4 May 2004.

Brief summary
Philippe Noiret plays a henpecked childless farmer that lives oppressed by his authoritarian and materialistic wife, being the only worker in his farm. Whenever he attempts to take a small rest, indulge in any distraction, or simply falls asleep out of exhaustion, there she is chasing him to move on. When she and her elderly parents are killed in a car accident, he decides that the time has come to take it easy and enjoy life a little, sets all his livestock free, and then practically disappears. The only clue that he is still alive is his dog, who periodically goes shopping to the nearby town with a basket in its mouth. Concerns about Alexander's fate are the center of the town's gossip. After several attempts, a delegation sent by the citizens finds he has retired—to his bed. This creates no small social upheaval in this working-class small French town where hard work is regarded as a virtue, and hence his attitude is viewed as a scandal and a menace.

Cast
 Philippe Noiret — Alexandre 
 Françoise Brion — La Grande, Alexandre's wife
 Marlène Jobert — Agathe 
 Paul Le Person — Sanguin 
 Tsilla Chelton — Madame Bouillot 
 Léonce Corne — Lamendin 
 Pierre Richard — Colibert 
 Jean Saudray — Pinton 
 Marcel Bernier — Malicorne
 Bernard Charlan — The mayor
 Madeleine Damien — Madame Boisseau 
 Pierre Maguelon — Verglandier 
 François Vibert — Alexandre's father in law  
 Jean Carmet — La Fringale

References

Information about the film, synopsis, trailer 
Alexandre Le Bienheureux

External links
 
 

1968 films
French comedy films
1960s French-language films
1968 comedy films
Films about widowhood
1960s French films